With the annexation of Austria in 1938 by Nazi Germany, what was once the 4th Austrian Division was incorporated into the Wehrmacht (German Army) and re-designated the 45th Infantry Division. In the 1939 Invasion of Poland, the division was on the right wing of Gerd von Rundstedt's Army Group South.

On 22 June 1941, the 45th Infantry Division began Operation Barbarossa by starting the 9-day long siege of the Brest Fortress. In March 1942 the Red Army defeated the division at Livny, Russia and captured the archive of the division. That was the first time the Red Army learned about the defense of the Brest Fortress It suffered heavy casualties during the Battle of Kursk. It was rebuilt but virtually destroyed at Bobruysk in June 1944 during Operation Bagration.

45th (Volks) Grenadier Division 
It was again rebuilt as the 45th Volksgrenadier Division in the autumn of 1944 in Poland, by renaming the 546th Grenadier Division, which was still in formation. The division fought at Warsaw and Radom in 1945, retreating through Silesia to Koniggratz, and finally to Czechoslovakia, where it surrendered.

Commanding officers
 General der Infanterei Friedrich Materna (1 April 1938 – 1 October 1940)
 Generalmajor Gerhard Körner, (25 October 1940 – 27 April 1941)
 Generalleutnant Fritz Schlieper, (27 April 1941 – 27 February 1942)
 Generalleutnant Fritz Kühlwein, (27 February 1942 – 25 April 1943)
 Generalleutnant Hans Freiherr von Falkenstein, (25 April 1943 – 30 November 1943)
 Generalmajor Joachim Engel, (30 November 1943 – 27 February 1944)
 Generalmajor Gustav Gihr, (27 February 1944 – 9 April 1944)
 Generalmajor Joachim Engel, (9 April 1944 – ? June 1944)
 Generalmajor Richard Daniel, (19 July 1944 – March 1945)
 Generalmajor Erich Hassenstein, (March 1945 – 2 May 1945)

Order of battle

1939 

 Infantry Regiment 130
 Infantry Regiment 133
 Infantry Regiment 135
 Reconnaissance Detachment 45
 Artillery Regiment 98
 I Detachment
 II Detachment
 III Detachment
 I/Artillery Regiment 99
 Engineer Battalion 81
 Anti-Tank Detachment 45
 Signal Detachment 65
 Field Replacement Battalion 45
 Supply Unit 45

1942 

 Grenadier Regiment 130
 Grenadier Regiment 133
 Grenadier Regiment 135
 Bicycle Detachment 45
 Artillery Regiment 98
 I Detachment
 II Detachment
 III Detachment
 I/Artillery Regiment 99
 Engineer Battalion 81
 Panzerjäger Detachment 45
 Signal Detachment 65
 Field Replacement Battalion 45
 Supply Unit 45

1943–1944 

 Grenadier Regiment 130
 Grenadier Regiment 133
 Grenadier Regiment 135
 Fusilier Battalion 45
 Artillery Regiment 98
 I Detachment
 II Detachment
 III Detachment
 I/Artillery Regiment 99
 Engineer Battalion 81
 Panzerjäger Detachment 45
 Signal Detachment 65
 Field Replacement Battalion 45 (2)
 Supply Unit 45

References

0*045
Military units and formations established in 1938
Military units and formations disestablished in 1945